Nahr-e Mochri (also Romanized as Nahr-e Mochrī) is a village in Nasar Rural District, Arvandkenar District, Abadan County, Khuzestan Province, Iran. At the 2006 census, its population was 342, in 72 families.

References 

Populated places in Abadan County